Mimasyngenes lineatipennis is a species of beetle in the family Cerambycidae. It was described by Breuning in 1950. It is known from Argentina and Brazil.

References

Desmiphorini
Beetles described in 1950